Prionochaeta opaca is a species of small carrion beetle in the family Leiodidae. It is found in North America.

References

Further reading

 
 

Leiodidae
Articles created by Qbugbot
Beetles described in 1825